Title I ("Title 1" or "Title One") may refer to:

 Title I of the Elementary and Secondary Education Act
 Title 1 of the Code of Federal Regulations
 Title 1 of the United States Code, outlines the general provisions of the United States Code
 Title I (New Hampshire)
 Title I of the Civil Rights Act of 1964